Germolene is the brand name used on a range of antiseptic products produced by the Bayer company, who purchased the brand from GlaxoSmithKline, then known as Smithkline Beecham, in 1999. It is manufactured for Bayer UK by the Devon based Wrafton Laboratories division of US over-the counter and supermarket own-label preparation producer Perrigo.

Originally a thick antiseptic ointment with a distinctive pink colour and scented with oil of wintergreen, Germolene was also reformulated as a cream, with both an ointment (pink) and cream (white) form being sold. The brand name is used on a range of over-the-counter first aid preparations, most of which contain antiseptic. There is an associated range of products, specifically for the treatment of haemorrhoids. The thick pink Germolene ointment was confirmed by Bayer as no longer being available to the UK public in July 2014. As of 2015, it is only available with a doctor's prescription. Germolene IS available to the UK public in most chemists and supermarkets.

Germolene was invented by cough mixture tycoon Sir William Henry Veno, who in 1925, fearing he had cancer of the lip, sold his Veno Drug Company to the Beechams Company.

Warning:  Germolene's Phenol ingredient is highly toxic to pets and small animals.

Composition
Germolene's active ingredients include phenol 1.2% (providing antiseptic, locally analgesic and antipruritic effects) and chlorhexidine digluconate 0.25%. The Germoloids line of Germolene products, intended for use on haemorrhoids, also includes zinc oxide, and the analgesic lidocaine hydrochloride.

References 

Antiseptics